Are Husbands Necessary? is a 1942 American comedy film directed by Norman Taurog and starring Ray Milland and Betty Field. It follows the misadventures of a wacky wife and her sometimes exasperated, but loving, banker husband. The film's screenplay was adapted by the husband-and-wife writing team of Tess Slesinger and Frank Davis, from the novel Mr. and Mrs. Cugat, the Record of a Happy Marriage by Isabel Scott Rorick. This novel would later be a source for the related 1948 radio series My Favorite Husband starring Lucille Ball, which itself would evolve into the television series I Love Lucy.

A one-hour Lux Radio Theatre adaptation of the film, featuring George Burns and Gracie Allen, aired February 15, 1943, on CBS Radio.

Cast
Ray Milland as George Cugat
Betty Field as Mary Elizabeth Cugat
Patricia Morison as Myra Ponsonby
Eugene Pallette as Bunker
Philip Terry as Cory Cartwright
Richard Haydn as Chuck
Charles Dingle as Duncan Atterbury
Kathleen Lockhart as Laura Atterbury
Leif Erickson as Bill Stone
Cecil Kellaway as Dr. Buell
Elizabeth Risdon as Mrs. Westwood
Charlotte Wynters as Mrs. Finley

References

External links
Are Husbands Necessary? review at The New York Times
Are Husbands Necessary? at IMDb
Are Husbands Necessary? at TCMDB

1942 films
1942 comedy films
American black-and-white films
American comedy films
1940s English-language films
Films directed by Norman Taurog
Films scored by Robert Emmett Dolan
Paramount Pictures films
1940s American films